A gubernatorial election was held on 13 April 1975 to elect the Governor of Hokkaido Prefecture.

Candidates
Naohiro Dōgakinai - incumbent governor of Hokkaido Prefecture, age 60.
Kozo Igarashi - former mayor of Asahikawa, Hokkaidō, age 49.

Results

References

Hokkaido gubernational elections
1975 elections in Japan